The chucky madtom (Noturus crypticus) is a critically endangered  freshwater fish endemic to the U.S. state of Tennessee.

It has been observed in two streams in eastern Tennessee, Little Chucky Creek and Dunn Creek.  The last observed specimen in Dunn Creek was collected in 1940 and the species is likely no longer present in that location. Because the species is endangered, and the number of known individuals is so low, there is no information regarding spawning conditions or diet. However, it is theorized that they may spawn in the early summer. Due to the dismal population size little is also known about the life history. The population is in decline most likely due to habitat degradation. The current management plan for the species seems to focus around maintaining the ecosystem it currently lives in. It is a federally endangered species. Conservation Fisheries inc, initiated a captive breeding program in 2004. The fish is constrained to a 3 km (1.9 mi) stretch of Little Chucky Creek and does not expand from that region although there are suitable habitats nearby. This fish was described to science as a new species in 2005. It is in the elegans clade.

Appearance and anatomy
It is up to about 6.5 cm (2.6 in) long and pale colored with dark blotches.

Distribution 
The chucky madtom has an extremely small distribution and is only known to live in two streams in the French broad river system in eastern Tennessee. Only one specimen has been found in Dunn Creek in Sevier County. The Dunn Creek specimen was found in 1940 and no other specimens have been found in that location since leading many to believe the population in Dunn Creek has been extirpated. The majority of the specimens have come from Little Chucky Creek in Greene county Tennessee. It is not known why these two small streams are the only place where the species is found, as there is similar habitat along portions of the Little Chucky Creek. Further surveys of surrounding areas with suitable habitat did not yield any more specimens. The streams contain mussels that are indicative of high water quality.

Areas of slow riffles and some moderate flows characterize the portions of the Little Chucky Creek that the chucky madtom occupies. The beds of these streams usually consist of gravel or flat slabs of rock. Due to the small amount of specimens observed in the wild there is currently no information about the diet of the chucky madtom or whether or not it has any natural predators. The species the chucky madtom competes with is also unknown, although when chucky madtom species were collected there were other species of fish usually present. Species such as the central stoneroller, banded sculpins, greenside darters, redline darters, and banded darters. The current habitat has a few indicators of good stream health like the aforementioned mussels. Upstream from the known range of the madtom there is some impact on the land from agricultural use. Environmental pressures like siltation and destruction of the riparian zone may play a key part in the range of this endangered fish.

Life history and ecology 
Due to the small range and lack of specimens, little is known about the life history of the chucky madtom. There is currently no information about diet, predators, spawning times, fecundity, or sex ratio. The low species count and protected status of this species makes it challenging for researchers to examine the diet of this species. Using other species one could potentially draw conclusions to the chucky madtoms feeding and reproduction habits. Other madtoms, such as the least madtom (Noturus hildebrandi), are not sexually mature until one year of age. Noturus hildebrandi and other madtoms breed in the late spring to early summer. Smoky madtoms usually selected nesting sites located under flat rocks. In smoky madtoms, mayfly nymphs comprised a significant chunk of their diet. Although exact feeding habits are unknown, it may be possible that the chucky madtom exhibit some of the same behaviors as these other species.

Current management plan 
The chucky madtom is a federally endangered species and there is a recovery plan drafted up by conservation fisheries inc. Conservation fisheries inc (CFI), is a Knoxville-based non-profit organization that exists to reintroduce and rehabilitate natural species. The organization performs captive breeding programs with endangered fishes in order to preserve the biodiversity of southeastern streams. A captive breeding program was started with the chucky madtom, a male and female madtom was collected and lived in the facility. Unfortunately the female died before they could spawn.

In the management plan CFI says that agricultural use of the surrounding land has most likely contributed most to the small range of the chucky madtom. According to the Tennessee Valley Authority Little Chucky Creek is “Biologically impaired.” If not properly practiced, some agricultural practices can lead to siltation of streams due to erosion of the streams banks as well as debris and particulates from runoff. Siltation affects bottom feeders like the chucky madtom as it removes hiding places as well as covering potential food. It is theorized that this sediment contaminating these streams are inhibiting both the feeding and reproductive practices of the chucky madtom. The Middle Nolichucky Watershed Alliance (MNWA) is currently responsible for carrying out the restoration plan for the chucky madtom. They plan to sustain the population by carrying out two objectives. The first objective is protecting the habitat by ensuring proper land use, This should help with the water quality problems by addressing point pollution as well as other factors such as faulty septic tanks and other pollutants. The second objective is to gather more information about the biology of this species. In order to continue, more information must be acquired so food sources and other factors can be managed if needs be.

References

Further reading
Egge, J. JD, Simons, Andrew M. (2010) Evolution of venom delivery structures in madtom catfishes (Siluriformes: Ictaluridae) Zoological Journal of the Linnean Society 102 115-129
Rakes P.L, Shute J.R (2004) [SURVEYS FOR THE CHUCKY MADTOM(Noturus sp., cf. elegans) IN LITTLE CHUCKY CREEK, GREENE COUNTY, TENNESSEE], Final report to U.S. Fish and Wildlife Service Cookeville, TN field office.
Kuhaja et al. (2009) The Desperate Dozen: Southeaster Freshwater Fishes on the Brink., Southeastern fishes council proceedings 51 10-31.

External links
Noturus crypticus. FishBase.

chucky madtom
Endemic fauna of Tennessee
Freshwater fish of the Southeastern United States
Ecology of the Appalachian Mountains
Greene County, Tennessee
chucky madtom
ESA endangered species